Yun Tu Hai Pyar Bohut is a Pakistani television series directed and produced by Kashif Saleem under banner Film Factory, written by Aliya Bukhari and aired on Hum TV. It stars Hira Mani and Affan Waheed in lead roles. It marked their third on-screen appearance after Do Bol and Ghalati. The serial received praise for its strong writing and progressive themes.

Plot 
Aima is a young ambitious girl, studying law and is the sole breadwinner of her family. She lives with her mother and younger sister, Naji who is immature and somehow irresponsible. Aima is in love with her cousin Zain and vice versa, but unlike her Zain is not too excited and ambitious about his aspirations to become a singer. Aima's father Mohsin married Roohi and left Aima's mother years ago. Mohsin has a daughter, Sonia who is fond of music and her mother is worried about her. Sonia comes across Zain in a school where both of them work and become friends.

Due to Zain's careless behaviour, Aima stops seeing him and moves on. She gets a job and assists a senior lawyer. Zain also moves to Lahore for better opportunities. In Lahore he lives with a couple Maqsood and Deena and their little son Sarwaar (Saru).

Cast 
Main
 Affan Waheed as Zain
 Hira Mani as Aima

Recurring
 Sabeena Syed as Sonia
 Javaid Sheikh as Mohsin
 Nadia Hussain as Roohi
 Abeer Sajid as Nazi/ Nazreen
 Akhtar Hasnain as Rehan
 Komal Rizvi as Noor
 Muneeb Baig
 Hina Chaudhary as Beena
 Mariam Mirza as Talat 
 Fawad Jalal as Sarwar
 Qaiser Khan Nizamani as Advocate
 Rizwan Ali Jaffri as Fakher
 Faisal Masood 
 Abdullah (child star)

Soundtrack

The original Playback Singers soundtrack is sung by Jibran Raheel Hira Mani and Ayaz Sheikh composed by AD Studio on lyrics of SK Khalish.
Playback Singer Ayaz Sheikh Sung Slow Version and Promo Version - Playback Singer Jibran Raheel Sung Main Version - Playback Singer Hira Mani Sung - Slow Version

Production

Broadcast
There were several discussions laid on its time slot, previously it was announced that the show will premier on May 21, 2021, airing an episode on Fridays at 9pm slot. Later, it was switched to Mondays and Tuesdays at 8pm slot by replacing Safar Tamam Howa as it came to an end. After the starting of the drama serial Parizaad, it shifted to only Mondays at 8pm. But then again timings changed and Aakhir Kab Tak, which used to air on Sundays started to air on Mondays because of Hum Kahan Ke Sachay Thay and Yun Tu Hai Pyar Bohut shifted to Fridays at 8pm.

References

External links 
 Official website

Pakistani romantic drama television series
Urdu-language television shows
2021 Pakistani television series debuts
Hum TV original programming
2021 Pakistani television series endings
Pakistani drama television series